Waiye Rural LLG is a local-level government (LLG) of Chimbu Province, Papua New Guinea.

Wards
01. Kupau
02. Pari
03. Kurumugl
04. Nogoma
05. Koglai
06. Anigl
07. Guo
08. Wandi
09. Yuagle/Mindima Camp
10. Mindima
11. Gor
12. Gor
13. Koroma
14. Nogar
15. Nogar
16. Dingile
17. Kondo

References

Local-level governments of Chimbu Province